Crossbones (Brock Rumlow) is a supervillain appearing in American comic books published by Marvel Comics. The character is usually depicted as an adversary of Captain America, and played a part in his assassination.

The character has been adapted into multiple forms of media, most notably being portrayed by Frank Grillo in the Marvel Cinematic Universe films Captain America: The Winter Soldier (2014), Captain America: Civil War (2016), and Avengers: Endgame (2019). Additionally, Grillo voices alternative versions in the Disney+ animated series What If...? (2021).

Publication history
Created by writer Mark Gruenwald and artist Kieron Dwyer, Crossbones first made a cameo appearance in Captain America #359 (October 1989) as a shrouded figure watching from the shadows, making a full appearance during the "Bloodstone Hunt" storyline in issue #362.

He has appeared as a regular character in Thunderbolts beginning with issue #144, but was dismissed from the team in issue #151.

Fictional character biography
Brock Rumlow led the Savage Crims gang on New York City's Lower East Side, during which time, he assaulted fifteen-year-old Rachel Leighton and fought Rachel's two brothers, killing the elder brother. Rumlow fled, entering Taskmaster's school for criminals, within three years becoming an instructor under the name Bingo Brock.

As a mercenary, Rumlow enlisted with Albert Malik, the communist Red Skull, in Algeria, serving the Red Skull under the name Frag until he was sent to invade Arnim Zola's Switzerland chateau; Rumlow was ultimately the only team member to survive the assault. There, he also met and impressed, Johann Schmidt, the original Nazi Red Skull, who accepted Brock's services and code-named him as "Crossbones".

The true Red Skull sent Crossbones to observe Baron Helmut Zemo's progress acquiring the Bloodstone fragments and to obtain them. He stowed aboard Captain America's flagship, and entered Zemo's ship to steal the Bloodstone fragments. He overpowered Diamondback, and shot a crossbow bolt that coupled with Captain America's shield. Crossbones was forced to shatter the Bloodstone fragments when the alien entity known as the Hellfire Helix used it to take control of Baron Heinrich Zemo's body; the destruction of the Bloodstone discorporated the Hellfire Helix. Knowing that his master would be infuriated by the Bloodstone's loss, Crossbones kidnapped Diamondback to Madripoor as bait for Captain America. He challenged Captain America to retrieve Diamondback, but the Captain defeated him, although Diamondback escaped, and the Red Skull ordered Crossbones to desist and return to headquarters. The Red Skull then ordered him to retrieve the Controller after the Controller's breakout from the Vault. With the Machinesmith, Crossbones investigated the Red Skull's disappearance.

Crossbones assembled the Skeleton Crew from the Red Skull's henchmen and led them on a search for the Red Skull, who had been missing since Magneto imprisoned him in an underground bunker. They battled the Black Queen and her Hellfire Club mercenaries. Crossbones enlisted the aid of psychic Tristam Micawber to locate the Red Skull. Upon finding his master, Crossbones took the Red Skull to Skullhouse for convalescence.

He next attended AIM's weapons exposition. He battled Daredevil during a failed assassination attempt against the Kingpin. He battled Bullseye during Bullseye's failed assassination attempt against the Red Skull. He battled Captain America again and was defeated. He later recounts how he met the Red Skull. The Red Skull assigned him to discover who killed the Red Skull's spare clone bodies. Alongside the Skeleton Crew, he battled the Schutzheilligruppe in an attempt to rescue the Red Skull but was captured. He was rescued from the Schutzheilligruppe's custody by Arnim Zola's fake Avengers. Crossbones was eventually fired for questioning the Red Skull's decision to ally himself with the Viper.

Desperate to regain his position as leader of the Skeleton Crew, Crossbones kidnapped Diamondback, imprisoning in an abandoned subway station and forced into a brutal regime of combat training. Crossbones believed that he had brainwashed Diamondback into betraying Captain America, but Diamondback was actually laying a trap for Crossbones. Diamondback stole samples of Captain America's blood from the Avengers' mansion, then accompanied Crossbones to the Red Skull's mountain fortress. The two were captured and imprisoned, and the Red Skull rehired Crossbones on a temporary basis. He was later attacked by Cutthroat, the Skeleton Crew's new leader, who feared that Crossbones will try to take back his position as the Red Skull's right-hand man. Crossbones killed Cutthroat, never realizing that Cutthroat was actually Diamondback's older brother. Crossbones later stabbed Diamondback during Diamondback's escape attempt, only to later save with a blood transfusion to use as bait. He was critically wounded by flying shrapnel during an assault on the fortress by Captain America and the Falcon, and imprisoned.

Imprisoned in the Raft when Electro breaks the inmates out, Crossbones was seen fighting Captain America and Spider-Man. Spider-Man kicked Crossbones in the face, knocking him out.

After he escaped from prison, Crossbones became a mercenary and assassin for a number of organizations, until he was rehired by the Red Skull who was later apparently assassinated by the Winter Soldier. Crossbones and his new lover, Synthia Schmidt (the Red Skull's daughter), began hunting Aleksander Lukin, the Winter Soldier's commander. They plotted to crash a stolen World War II era plane into the new Kronas Headquarters in London, only to have their plane destroyed by the Red Skull's Sleeper robot. While they escape the destruction of the plane, they found Agent 13, and are about to kill Sharon Carter, only to be stopped by the Red Skull's appearance. They begin working with Red Skull/Lukin whose minds both share Lukin's body.

Following the "Civil War" storyline, Captain America's Anti-Registration heroes surrendered to Iron Man's Pro-Registration heroes. While being led from Federal Courthouse, Captain America was shot in the shoulder by Crossbones taking the Red Skull's orders. Crossbones tries to escape in a helicopter but was tracked by the Falcon and the Winter Soldier. The Winter Soldier then beat Crossbones into unconsciousness, while Crossbones simply laughed. Falcon then turned Crossbones over to S.H.I.E.L.D. custody.

In Fallen Son: The Death of Captain America, Wolverine, along with Daredevil and Doctor Strange, broke into S.H.I.E.L.D. to interrogate Crossbones and threatened to kill him. Crossbones revealed no knowledge of his hiring by the Red Skull. Wolverine left him a bloody mess on the floor after being convinced by Daredevil to spare his life.

S.H.I.E.L.D. Director Tony Stark arranged for Professor X to scan Crossbones' mind for information, but Professor X found that someone had erased several parts of his memory to prevent such a scan. Sin and a new incarnation of the Serpent Squad have broken Crossbones free of S.H.I.E.L.D. custody. They then capture the Winter Soldier when confronting Lukin to find out a relationship with the Red Skull.

When Sin and the Serpent Squad attacked the Senate Building, Bucky Barnes arrived as the new Captain America. After battling and injuring many of the Squad, Crossbones attacked Barnes. After a brutal fight in which Crossbones launched Barnes out of the building. Bucky was saved by the Natalia Romanova's intervention, and Bucky shot Crossbones several times in the chest. The gravely wounded Crossbones was then taken into S.H.I.E.L.D. custody once again.

At the start of the "Heroic Age" event, Crossbones has become a member of the new Thunderbolts team formed in the aftermath of Siege. Government agents, working with Luke Cage, add Crossbones to the team knowing that he cannot be reformed, hoping that his extreme methods will alienate the other Thunderbolt members and push them towards rehabilitation. During the team's first mission, Crossbones was exposed to corrupted Terrigen Mists; during the events of Shadowland, Crossbones manifested the ability to fire a powerful, piercing beam of energy from his face, theorizing that this ability originates from his exposure to the Terrigen mists. He uses this ability to murder a police officer. Fearing that the Thunderbolts are close to being disbanded following Cage's decision to leave, Crossbones attempted to escape alongside Ghost and Juggernaut. During the attempt, Crossbones used his new ability to fight the unsuspecting Steve Rogers. Crossbones was defeated and discharged from the Thunderbolts, after Ghost revealed his murder of the police officer. Crossbones is shown incarcerated in a padded cell wearing a straitjacket, apparently no longer able to use his energy beam.

During the "Fear Itself" storyline, Crossbones was constantly harassed while he was behind bars, because he was both a former Thunderbolt member and a Neo-Nazi. Shortly after when he was being beaten up by more thugs, Juggernaut unintentionally causes a break out in the prison facility called the Raft. Man Mountain Mario (the cousin of Man Mountain Marko) helps defend Crossbones from the thugs. While the two of them were trying to escape, Mario told Crossbones about his grandma who helps criminals leave the border. Crossbones manages to escape and returns the favor by killing Mario to help with his escape. He confronts some of the former Avengers Initiative members in New Jersey after he escapes the Raft. He fights Gravity, Frog-Man, Geiger, Scarlet Spiders, and Firestar. When he's surrounded, he tosses a grenade at Gravity but Geiger catches it and is seriously injured, creating an easy distraction for him to escape.

During the "Ends of the Earth" storyline, Crossbones was seen in one of Doctor Octopus' facilities. Sabra fights past some Octobots until Crossbones shoots Sabra.

Crossbones later appears as a member of HYDRA who are planning to spread poisonous blood extracted from an Inhuman boy named Lucas. He fights Sam Wilson as the new Captain America on Bagalia. Just as he was about to kill Wilson, he is defeated by Misty Knight who was undercover at that moment. He is later defeated by Wilson when he attacks a HYDRA base located on Florida.

During the "Avengers: Standoff!" storyline, Crossbones was an inmate of Pleasant Hill, a gated community established by S.H.I.E.L.D. When Steve Rogers was at the Pleasant Hill Bowling Alley trying to reason with Kobik, Crossbones attacks Rogers. Before Crossbones can kill Rogers, Kobik's powers de-age Rogers back to physical prime, which allows the Captain to defeat Crossbones. In the aftermath of the events at Pleasant Hill, Crossbones founds a new version of HYDRA with the Red Skull and Sin.

During the "Secret Empire" storyline, Crossbones appears as a member of the Army of Evil and took part in the attack on Manhattan in retaliation for what happened at Pleasant Hill. Crossbones and Sin are shown to be in charge of a super-prison that was established by Hydra. Their super-prison was raided by the Underground in their mission to free their captive friends.

During the "Devil's Reign" storyline, Crossbones appears as a member of Mayor Wilson Fisk's incarnation of the Thunderbolts at the time when Mayor Fisk passed a law that forbids superhero activity. He leads the NYPD into raiding Rand Corporation to arrest Danny Rand. As he didn't have his "iron fist" ability, Danny held his own against Crossbones and the NYPD operatives with him before they defeated him.

Powers and abilities
An expert combatant trained in warfare, Crossbones is an accomplished military tactician, and is thus able to formulate strategies on the battlefield. He also has extensive training in martial arts, street-fighting, marksmanship, and various forms of hand-to-hand combat. He once served as a student at the Taskmaster's school for criminals before becoming an instructor there himself. Physically, Crossbones is tall and well built, but moves with an athletic grace uncommon for a man of his bulk. In addition, he is proficient in the use of various weapons, such as guns, bows, and throwing knives. One of Crossbones' primary weapons are spring-loaded stiletto blades housed in his gauntlets. He also has experience with torture and brainwashing, having effectively "reprogrammed" Sin, and nearly so with Diamondback.

As a member of the Thunderbolts, Crossbones was exposed to corrupted Terrigen Mists during a mission, and shortly after manifested the ability to generate a circle of energy in front of his face which could fire energy beams capable of piercing and burning his targets. The ability developed to the point where flames engulfed the entirety of his head while still allowing him to fire focused energy beams, though these flames could seemingly be doused in water. While his power is active, Crossbones does not appear to be entirely impervious to the flames he generates. After the flames died following his first usage, his mask appeared to have been burnt away and his face was heavily scarred.

Other versions

Heroes Reborn
Crossbones appears in the Heroes Reborn universe as a partner/enforcer for the Red Skull and Master Man's World Party. This version also gets mutated by gamma radiation to combat Falcon and Captain America. He is killed by Rebel O'Reilly.

House of M
In the alternate reality depicted in the 2005 "House of M" storyline, Crossbones appeared as a member of Hood's extensive Masters of Evil. Before the Red Guard attacked Santo Rico, Crossbones left the team alongside, Cobra, Mister Hyde, and Thunderball.

Old Man Logan
In the pages of Old Man Logan that took place on Earth-21923, Crossbones is among the villains who work to take out the superheroes all at once. During the fight in Connecticut, Crossbones kills Wonder Man before being stepped on by Giant-Man.

Ultimate Marvel
A teenaged Crossbones appears in the Ultimate Marvel universe as a street punk and a member of the Serpent Skulls gang.

In other media

Television
 Crossbones appears in Avengers Assemble, voiced by Fred Tatasciore. Additionally, a Battleworld pirate incarnation of Crossbones appears in the episode "The Vibranium Coast".
 Crossbones appears in Ultimate Spider-Man, voiced again by Fred Tatasciore. This version is a HYDRA agent who eventually becomes its leader following Arnim Zola's death. In the two-part series finale "Graduation Day", Crossbones is attacked by the Scorpion, who mutates him into the Lizard so Doctor Octopus can brainwash him, have him join the Sinister Six, and help him attack Spider-Man. After defeating the Sinister Six, Spider-Man cures Crossbones, who takes his leave.
 Crossbones appears in Spider-Man, voiced again by Fred Tatasciore. In the episode "Spider-Island" Pt. 2, Crossbones gains spider-powers, but is defeated by Spider-Man, Spider-Gwen, Black Widow, and a group of spider-powered bystanders. In "Goblin War" Pt. 3, he becomes the leader of the Goblin Nation's War Goblins. However, an internal scuffle results in Crossbones weakening fellow leader Electro before being attacked by Ghost-Spider and defeated by Miles Morales.
 Crossbones appears in Marvel Future Avengers, voiced by Masato Obara in Japanese and Fred Tatasciore in English.

Marvel Cinematic Universe

Frank Grillo portrays Brock Rumlow in media set in the Marvel Cinematic Universe (MCU). This version is a Hydra double agent who publicly operates as the commander of S.H.I.E.L.D.'s counter-terrorism S.T.R.I.K.E. team before he is eventually exposed, becomes an armored mercenary, and commits suicide in a failed attempt at killing Captain America. Rumlow appears in the live-action films Captain America: The Winter Soldier and Captain America: Civil War. Additionally, alternate timeline versions of Rumlow appear in the live-action film Avengers: Endgame and the Disney+ animated series What If...?

Video games
 Crossbones appears as a boss in Captain America and the Avengers.
 Crossbones appears as a playable character in Lego Marvel's Avengers, voiced by Darren O'Hare. The MCU incarnation of Brock Rumlow is also playable, initially in his STRIKE uniform before his Crossbones design was added later via DLC.
 Crossbones appeared in Marvel Avengers Academy.
 Crossbones appears in Marvel Heroes.
 Crossbones appears in Marvel Contest of Champions.
 Crossbones appears as a playable character in Marvel Strike Force.
 Crossbones appears as a playable character in Marvel: Future Fight.
 Crossbones appears as a boss in Marvel's Avengers via the "War for Wakanda" DLC, voiced again by Fred Tatasciore. This version is a mercenary working for Ulysses Klaue and A.I.M.
 Crossbones appears in Marvel's Midnight Suns, voiced by Rick D. Wasserman.

References

External links
 Crossbones at Marvel.com
 

Action film villains
Captain America characters
Characters created by Mark Gruenwald
Comics characters introduced in 1989
Fictional assassins in comics
Fictional gunfighters in comics
Fictional henchmen
Fictional mass murderers
Fictional mercenaries in comics
Fictional military strategists
Fictional torturers and interrogators
Hydra (comics) agents
Marvel Comics martial artists
Marvel Comics neo-Nazis
Marvel Comics supervillains
Villains in animated television series